The 31st Grey Cup was played on November 27, 1943, before 16,423 fans at Varsity Stadium at Toronto.

The Hamilton Flying Wildcats defeated the Winnipeg RCAF Bombers 23–14.

Curiously, both teams wore red and white jerseys and one team had to wear gold and blue uniforms. Hamilton wore the Bombers traditional gold and blue while Winnipeg was allowed to keep its red jerseys.

External links
 
 

Grey Cup
Grey Cup
Grey Cups hosted in Toronto
Grey Cup
Grey Cup
1940s in Toronto